The 2008 Speedway Grand Prix of Latvia was the eighth race of the 2008 Speedway Grand Prix season. It was held on August 30, 2008, in the Latvijas Spidveja Centrs in Daugavpils, Latvia. The Grand Prix was won by Jason Crump from Australia, it was his second GP win of the season.

Riders 
The Speedway Grand Prix Commission nominated Grigory Laguta as a wild card, and Mr. John and Maksims Bogdanovs both as track reserves. The draw was made on August 19 at the FIM Headquarters in Mies, Switzerland.

Heat details

Heat after heat 
 (68.65) Hancock, N.Pedersen, Harris, Kasprzak
 (69.09) Adams, Gollob, Laguta, Iversen
 (69.29) Crump, Dryml, Holta, B.Pedersen
 (69.47) Jonsson, Nicholls, Andersen, Lindgren
 (69.54) Nicholls, Gollob, Harris, B.Pedersen
 (69.39) Hancock, Andersen, Laguta, Holta
 (70.44) Lindgren, Kasprzak, Adams, Dryml (F3)
 (69.77) N.Pedersen, Crump, Jonsson, Iversen
 (70.35) Jonsson, Harris, Dryml, Laguta
 (69.40) Crump, Lindgren, Gollob, Hancock
 (70.03) Kasprzak, B.Pedersen, Iversen, Andersen
 (70.30) N.Pedersen, Adams, Holta, Nicholls
 (69.31) Andersen, Adams, Harris, Crump (F3x)
 (70.07) Hancock, Dryml, Iversen (F2x), Nicholls (Fx)
 (70.50) Gollob, Jonsson, Kasprzak, Holta
 (71.00) N.Pedersen, B.Pedersen, Lindgren, Laguta (F4)
 (71.32) Harris, Holta, Lindgren, Iversen
 (71.05) B.Pedersen, Hancock, Adams, Bogdanow, Jonsson (M/-)
 (70.35) Crump, Nicholls, Kasprzak, Laguta
 (70.71) Gollob, Dryml, Andersen, N.Pedersen
 Semi-Finals:
 (71.55) Gollob, Hancock, Harris, Adams
 (70.74) N.Pedersen, Crump, Jonsson, B.Pedersen
 Final:
 (70.36) Crump (6 points), N.Pedersen (4), Gollob (2), Hancock (0)

The intermediate classification

See also 
 Speedway Grand Prix
 List of Speedway Grand Prix riders

References

External links 
 www.SpeedwayWorld.tv

Latvia
2008
Speedway Grand Prix Of Latvia, 2008